This is a partial list of rivers in Nebraska (U.S. state).

By tributary

Missouri River

Cheyenne River (SD)
Hat Creek
White River
Niobrara River
Burgess Creek
Bingham Creek
Snake River
Long Pine Creek
Keya Paha River
Verdigre Creek
North Branch Verdigre Creek
Middle Branch Verdigre Creek
Lamb Creek
Merriman Creek
Cottonwood Creek
East Branch Verdigre Creek
South Branch Verdigre Creek
Big Springs Creek
Hathoway Slough
Schindler Creek
Soldier Creek
Pishel Creek
Steel Creek
Red Otter Creek
Sand Creek
Louse Creek
East Branch Louse Creek
West Branch Louse Creek
Redbird Creek
Spring Creek
Blackbird Creek
Eagle Creek
Camp Creek
Oak Creek
East Branch Eagle Creek
Middle Branch Eagle Creek
North Branch Eagle Creek
Turkey Creek
Brush Creek
Spring Creek
Little Sandy Creek
Big Sandy Creek
Beaver Creek
Clay Creek
Otter Creek
Simpson Creek
Big Anne Creek
Haughin Creek
Ash Creek
Oak Creek
Willow Creek
Sand Creek
Rock Creek
Laughing Water Creek
Coon Creek
Tarbell Creek
Elk Creek
Wyman Creek
Long Pine Creek
Short Pine Creek
Bone Creek
Sand Draw
Willow Creek
Beeman Creek
Rickman Creek
Ponca Creek
Papillion Creek
Platte River
North Platte River
South Platte River
Lodgepole Creek
Wood River
Loup River
North Loup River
Calamus River
Middle Loup River
Dismal River
South Loup River
Cedar River
Elkhorn River
South Fork Elkhorn River
North Fork Elkhorn River
Logan Creek Dredge
Rock Creek
Salt Creek
Oak Creek
Stevens Creek
Middle Creek
Antelope Creek
Elk Creek
Beal Slough
Haines Branch
Cardwell Branch
Lynn Creek
Deadman's Run
Little Salt Creek
Nishnabotna River
Little Nemaha River
Big Nemaha River
Kansas River (KS)
Republican River
North Fork Republican River
Arikaree River
Buffalo Creek
Rock Creek
South Fork Republican River
Frenchman Creek
Blackwood Creek
 Driftwood Creek
Red Willow Creek
Medicine Creek
Sappa Creek
Big Blue River
West Fork Big Blue River
Little Blue River

Alphabetically
Arikaree River
Big Blue River
Big Nemaha River
Brawner Creek
Buckley Creek
Calamus River
Cedar River
Coon Creek
Dismal River
Dry Branch
Elkhorn River
Frenchman Creek
Keya Paha River
Little Blue River
Little Nemaha River
Lodgepole Creek
Logan Creek Dredge
Long Pine Creek
Loup River
Middle Loup River
Missouri River
Niobrara River
Nishnabotna River
North Fork Elkhorn River
North Loup River
North Platte River
Papillion Creek
Platte River
Ponca Creek
Republican River
Red Willow Creek
Rock Creek
Salt Creek
Sappa Creek
Silver Creek
Smith Creek
Snake River
South Fork Elkhorn River
South Loup River
South Platte River
Turkey Creek
West Fork Big Blue River
Whisky Run (Jefferson County, Nebraska)
White River
Wood River

See also

 List of rivers in the United States

References

External links

 Nebraska Streamflow Data from the USGS

Nebraska
Rivers